The Women's 500 m time trial competition at the 2018 UCI Track Cycling World Championships was held on 3 March 2018.

Results

Qualifying
The top 8 riders qualified for the final.

Final
The final was held at 18:30.

References

Women's 500 m time trial
UCI Track Cycling World Championships – Women's 500 m time trial